Mildred Reason Dube (died 27 June 2022) was a Zimbabwean politician who served in the Senate of Zimbabwe from 2018 until her death in 2022, representing Bulawayo. First elected in the 2018 Zimbabwean general election, Dube was a close ally of Thokozani Khupe.

In 2020, Dube, who was a member of the Movement for Democratic Change – Tsvangirai party, was threatened with expulsion from the party by party-leader Nixon Nyikadzino; however, she was protected by Khupe, who was the party's acting president. Dube later became the leader of the MDC–T's parliamentary caucus. However, in January 2022, Dube, Khupe, and two other allies of Khupe were expelled from the party, following Khupe's decision to split from the MDC–T and create a new party.

In 2021, Dube supported a bill proposed by the Zimbabwe African National Union – Patriotic Front, the ruling party of Zimbabwe, which would amend the Constitution of Zimbabwe to remove the direct election of the vice-president, extend the tenure of judges, and guarantee quotas for women in parliament and local government. The prior two provisions were seen as a move intended to concentrate power in the presidency. In addition to Dube, ten other MDC–T senators supported the amendment.

Dube died on 27 June 2022.

References 

20th-century births
2022 deaths
Date of birth missing
Year of birth missing
Place of birth missing
Place of death missing
21st-century Zimbabwean politicians
21st-century Zimbabwean women politicians
Members of the Senate of Zimbabwe
Movement for Democratic Change – Tsvangirai politicians
People from Bulawayo